The S-I was the first stage of the Saturn I rocket used by NASA for the Apollo program.

Design 

The S-I stage was powered by eight H-1 rocket engines burning RP-1 fuel with liquid oxygen (LOX) as oxidizer. The design of the S-I was based on Jupiter and Redstone tanks to leverage existing chains. A central Jupiter tank was surrounded by a cluster of eight Redstone tanks. Four of these Redstone tanks contained LOX and four contained RP-1. The outer tanks were painted to alter thermal conditions inside the tanks and to provide a "roll pattern" used to estimate radial motion during flight. The engines were arranged in two clusters, a group of four fixed central engines and a group of four outer gimbaled engines. The gimbals allowed the stage to be controlled with thrust vectoring. On launches after SA-5, eight fins were added to enhance control during atmospheric flight.

History 
The S-I stage was developed by Chrysler and consisted of 9 tanks that were previously used on existing rockets. The central tank was a Jupiter tank that held liquid oxygen. This Jupiter tank was sounded by eight Redstone tanks, four for liquid oxygen and four for RP-1. The first four launches had no fins on the S-I, but the remaining six added them to improve stability during atmospheric flight. The initial launch of the Saturn I consisted of an active S-I, an inactive S-IV and inactive S-V stage. Tensions were high as a launch vehicle of this size had never flown before. The S-I was partially loaded with propellant to lessen the destruction if an anomaly occurred near or on the pad. In the end, the launch was successful and the subsequent SA-5 launch was identified by John F. Kennedy as the launch that put the U.S. above the USSR in terms of lift capability.

Flight history

References 

Rocket stages
NASA space launch vehicles